6teen, originally titled The Mall, is a Canadian 2D-animated teen comedy drama television series created by Jennifer Pertsch and Tom McGillis which originally aired for four seasons and 93 episodes on Teletoon from November 7, 2004 until February 11, 2010.

Majority-directed by Karen Lessman and produced by Nelvana and Fresh TV for two seasons each, it also aired in the U.S. on Nickelodeon from 18 December 2005 to 13 May 2006 and on Cartoon Network (along with Total Drama Island and Stoked) from October 23, 2008 until June 21, 2010. Nelvana produced 78 of the overall 93 episodes and 2 45-minute television specials.

As of February 2023, it is available in various compilation bundles on YouTube.

Premise
This show is targeted at the preadolescent and teenage demographic, and focuses on the cast of six 16-year-old friends; Jude Lizowski, Jennifer 'Jen' Masterson, Nicole 'Nikki' Wong, Jonesy Garcia, Caitlin Cooke and Wyatt Williams, in common and typical teenage shenanigans, including their first part-time/full-time jobs, romance in terms of infatuations and relationships, first bank accounts and a sweet taste of freedom. The plots take place almost entirely in a megaplex shopping mall known as the Galleria Mall, which is a cross between the Toronto Eaton Centre and the West Edmonton Mall. The show is rated TV-PG due to suggestive language, kissing scenes and stunt acts.

Plot
Nikki finds herself stuck working at a clothing store known as The Khaki Barn, or "KB" for short, where she would not shop herself and has to grapple with three intimalely-looking girls. Jen has found her dream job at a sporting goods store, but sometimes makes mistakes. As a running gag, Jonesy manages to get fired from a new job at a store in almost every episode with a few exceptions. Wyatt falls hopelessly in love with his older co-worker called Sarina at coffee shop they work at. Jude works at various odd jobs throughout the show (including a fast food kiosk, a video rental shop and at the mall's hockey rink). Caitlin endures the daily humiliation of working at the lowest store in the mall's hierarchy of cool, a giant lemon-shaped lemonade stand known as "The Big Squeeze" where she's required to wear a hat shaped like a lemon as a part of her uniform. Throughout its run with the exception of four episodes, Jen and Caitlin looks out for and strive to go out with handsome guys only to get dumped towards their conclusions for baseless and confusing reasons.

Production and reunion
Fascinated and surprised by preteen-aged children watching adult-targeted sitcoms on the basis of their smart writing, fast-paced dialogue and various plot lines at the time, the show's co-creator Tom McGillis told locally-based Media Caster Magazine about making a show (this show) with the working title of The Mall in reference to shopping and teenage antics at the Toronto Eaton Centre.

Among the team of writers and directors for the show include Sean Cullen (The Sean Cullen Show), George Westerholm (This Hour Has 22 Minutes), Gary Hurst, Alice Prodanou and Hugh Duffy. The series' main characters were designed by Brad Coombs and the music composed by Donald "Don" Breithaupt and Anthony Vanderburgh.

The show was produced with a then newly-implemented hybrid-2D-computer animation animation software called "Opus" through a development partnership between Teletoon, Nelvana and Montreal-based acclaimed animation software company Toon Boom Animation.

An acoustic version of the theme music by Brian Melo is included in the show's final episode, "Bye Bye Nikki?".

A special reunion public-service announcement video titled "Vote, Dude!" was released on YouTube on 12 September 2018, with the original voice cast reprising their respective roles to raise awareness for voting in the 2018 US midterm elections, though no plans to bring back the show have been announced.

Characters

Episodes

Canada

United States

Reception and honours
The show has received critical acclaim locally throughout its run, including its ranking among Teletoon's Top 10 for children aged 10+ in the bilingual markets in the winter/spring season of 2005 as well as being the only Canadian production to be nominated for that year's Italian "TV Series for All Audiences" Pulcinella Award. Furthermore, it received an award from the Alliance for Children and Television for being the best of children's television to fall under the 9–14 age group on 2 June 2007. Carole Bonneau, the then-vice-president of programming at Teletoon, has remarked about the show:

Locally, the show garners about 2.5 million viewers each episode and in the United States, specifically on Cartoon Network, 1.8 million viewers each episode. It soon became one of the network's top shows between October 2008 and September 2009 with the steady increase in ratings up to its peak of 3.7 million viewers on 11 June 2009 following the season premiere of Total Drama Action. As time went on, starting in October 2009, the show declined in ratings falling to its lowest rating at 1.6 million viewers for its 21 June 2010 series finale.

In 2009, the show won the Daytime Emmy for Outstanding Original Song (Main Title and Promo) for its theme song which was performed by Phil Naro.

Censorship
Because the show  was targeted towards mature children (preteens and teenagers), 24 out of the 93 produced episodes were considered too risqué or inappropriate by its American broadcasters Cartoon Network and Nickelodeon, leading to either their censorship or removals. With the legalization of same-sex marriage in Canada occurring around the time of the series' release, many of its episodes included references and innuendos to homosexuality, most of which were censored in the U.S. Other censorships and bans in the U.S. included a plot line that focused on shoplifting and nude images that were modified from the series' original blur-out to a full black bar.

Notes

References

External links

 
 Nelvana production website (Archived)
 Fresh TV production website

2000s Canadian animated television series
2000s Canadian comedy-drama television series
2000s Canadian teen drama television series
2000s Canadian workplace comedy television series
2000s workplace drama television series
2010s Canadian animated television series
2010s Canadian comedy-drama television series
2010s Canadian teen drama television series
2010s Canadian workplace comedy television series
2010s workplace drama television series
2004 Canadian television series debuts
2010 Canadian television series endings
Canadian children's animated comedy television series
Canadian children's animated drama television series
Canadian flash animated television series
English-language television shows
Teletoon original programming
Teen animated television series
Television series by Fresh TV
Television series by Nelvana
Television shows set in Toronto
Television shows filmed in Toronto
Canadian animated comedy television series
Canadian LGBT-related animated television series
Television censorship in the United States
Censored television series